Marlene Madrigal Flores is a Costa Rican agricultural worker activist and a current deputy from Heredia in the Legislative Assembly.

Madrigal has a technical education.

Agricultural activist

Madrigal has worked in several capacities as an agricultural activist. She has been a Resister for Sarapiquí, Vice-President of the National Agricultural Commission, President of the National Federation of Banana Workers, and a promoter for the Citizens' Action Party (PAC for its Spanish initials) in Sarapiquí. She has also worked for a number of agricultural companies and international agricultural unions.

In 2013 alone, she visited the Legislative Assembly a total of 16 times.

Political career
When Madrigal began running for deputy in 2013, she was 42 years old. She was elected as a PAC candidate alongside economist Henry Mora Jiménez. In the general election, Madrigal was elected and she will now serve for the 2014 to 2018 legislative term.

References

Living people
Members of the Legislative Assembly of Costa Rica
Citizens' Action Party (Costa Rica) politicians
Workers' rights activists
21st-century Costa Rican women politicians
21st-century Costa Rican politicians
People from Heredia Province
Year of birth missing (living people)